Uparichara Vasu is a king featured in Hindu literature, a member of the Chandravamsha (Lunar dynasty). The son of Kruti, he rules over the kingdom of Chedi. He is described to be a friend of Indra and a great devotee of Vishnu in the Puranas. His legend is also described in the Mahabharata.

Legend

Puranas 
The Skanda Purana and the Vayu Purana state that Uparichara Vasu is a king so pious that he is able to ride his chariot across the sky. When there is a dispute that arises between the devas and the sages about the interpretation of the term 'Aja' in a Vedic injunction that prescribed for a sacrificial offering, they decide to go to Uparichara Vasu for arbitration. The sages state that such a sacrifice must be performed using grains, and the devas insist that such a sacrifice must be performed using animals such as goats. The king rules in favour of the devas. The sages, angry that the king had advocated against ahimsa, cursed him to fall towards the netherworld.  He is saved by Garuda upon the instruction of Vishnu, who brings him to Svarga. The Skanda Purana states that the king is punished because he once sees s mind-born daughter of the Pitrs named Acchoda, and an apsara named Adrika. Because they regard each other as father and daughter, they are cursed by the Pitrs to be born on earth.

Mahabharata 
The Mahabharata narrates that a mountain in the king's domain, Kolahala, was once maddened by lust, and attacked a river, blocking her path. The river sought the protection of Uparichara Vasu, who split the mountain with a kick, allowing the river to pass through. By the union of the mountain and the river, a man and a woman emerged. The boy was made commander-in-chief of Vasu's army, while the girl, Girika, was married to Vasu. 

Uparichara Vasu's wife, Girika, having purified herself after bathing, informed her husband that it was an auspicious time for them to engage in intercourse. During this period, the king is also visited by his Pitrs, who wish him to hunt some deer for them. Deciding to prioritise the instructions of his ancestors, the king sets out to the forest to hunt, thinking about his beautiful wife. When he ejaculates, he decides that it would not be appropriate to waste his semen during his wife's ovulation. Depositing the semen on a leaf, he requests a hawk to carry his seed to his wife. While the hawk is flying, it is attacked by another hawk, and the semen falls into the river Yamuna. The semen is swallowed by a fish, the rebirth of Adrika. When a fisherman cuts open the belly of the fish, he finds a human boy and a girl within. The children are brought to Uparichara Vasu, who adopts the male child, naming his Matsya, who becomes his heir. The girl is adopted by the fisherman, and is named Satyavati.

In the text, the king is described to be the disciple of Sage Brihaspati, living in the Satya Yuga. The sage teaches him the Satvata Shastra, the knowledge of which guides his rule, and due to which he becomes a patron of the Pancharatra rituals dedicated to Narayana. The epic also describes a legend in which Uparichara Vasu commences an ashvamedha sacrifice, but orders that no animals be slain. Instead, he offers the products of the forests to the devas, who come to receive his offerings. Vishnu is so pleased by this act that he appears at the ritual site, but allows only the king to witness him. This angers Brihaspati, but the king reminds his preceptor that witnessing Vishnu is entirely up to him, describing it to be akin to a prasada.

References

External links 
 The Mahabharata of Krishna-Dwaipayana Vyasa Translated into English Prose, Bharata Press, Calcutta (1883–1896)

Lunar dynasty
Characters in the Mahabharata